Francisco 'Fran' José Carnicer Magán (born 30 March 1991) is a Spanish footballer who plays for Linares Deportivo as a midfielder.

Football career
Born in Linares, Jaén, Andalusia, Carnicer made his senior debuts for CD Linares' reserve team in the 2007–08 campaign. In the 2008 summer he moved to Polideportivo Ejido, returning to youth football before appearing with Las Norias CF's main squad in 2009.

In June 2009 Carnicer moved to Real Jaén, initially assigned to the Juvenil squad. He subsequently appeared with the B-side in the regional leagues, and made his first-team debut in the 2010–11 season, in Segunda División B.

On 7 July 2011 Carnicer signed a two-year deal with CA Osasuna, being assigned to the reserves also in the third level. After appearing regularly with the Navarrese outfit (also being relegated in his second season), he moved to fellow league team La Hoya Lorca CF.

On 15 July 2014 Carnicer joined Segunda División's CD Mirandés. He made his professional debut on 11 October, coming on as a late substitute in a 0–1 away loss against SD Ponferradina.

On 7 February 2015 Carnicer scored his first professional goal, netting the first in a 2–2 away draw against AD Alcorcón.

References

External links

1991 births
Living people
People from Linares
Spanish footballers
Footballers from Andalusia
Association football midfielders
Segunda División players
Segunda División B players
Tercera División players
Real Jaén footballers
CA Osasuna B players
Lorca FC players
CD Mirandés footballers
Albacete Balompié players
Real Murcia players
SD Ponferradina players
UD San Sebastián de los Reyes players
Linares Deportivo footballers